The 2024 United States Senate election in Mississippi will be held on November 5, 2024, to elect a member of the United States Senate to represent the state of Mississippi. Incumbent two-term Republican Senator Roger Wicker was re-elected with 58.5% of the vote in 2018.

Republican primary

Candidates

Declared 
 Roger Wicker, incumbent U.S. senator

Democratic primary

Candidates

Declared
Ty Pinkins, lawyer and U.S. Army veteran

General election

Predictions

References

External links 
Official campaign sites
 Roger Wicker (R) for Senate
 Ty Pinkins (D) for Senate

2024
Mississippi
United States Senate